The 2010 Roma Open was a professional tennis tournament played on outdoor red clay courts. It was part of the 2010 ATP Challenger Tour. It took place in Rome, Italy between 19 and 24 April 2010.

ATP entrants

Seeds

 Rankings are as of April 12, 2010.

Other entrants
The following players received wildcards into the singles main draw:
  Florian Mayer
  Alberto Brizzi
  Mario Ančić
  Matteo Trevisan

The following players received special exempt into the singles main draw:
  Jesse Huta Galung

The following players received entry from the qualifying draw:
  Daniele Bracciali
  Andrea Arnaboldi
  Rainer Eitzinger
  Alessio di Mauro

The following players received the lucky loser spot:
  Francesco Aldi
  Lamine Ouahab
  Artem Smirnov

Champions

Singles

 Federico del Bonis def.  Florian Mayer, 6–4, 6–3

Doubles

 Mario Ančić /  Ivan Dodig def.  Juan Pablo Brzezicki /  Rubén Ramírez Hidalgo, 4–6, 7–6(8), [10–4]

References

Italian Tennis Federation official website
ITF search 

Roma Open
Roma Open